The word grisette may mean:

 Grisette (person), a working-class woman, originally French, or later, good-time girl
 Grisette (beer), a variety of beer from the border region of Belgium and France.
 the Eurasian minnow

Any of several species of gill mushrooms in the otherwise poisonous genus Amanita:
 Grisette, Amanita vaginata
 Snakeskin grisette, Amanita ceciliae
 Tawny grisette, Amanita fulva